Destination: Morgue! L.A. Tales is a 2004 collection of 12 short works by American crime fiction writer James Ellroy. Eight of the pieces are non-fiction crime reportage or essays that Ellroy originally wrote for GQ magazine, some of which are autobiographical (see also his memoir My Dark Places). Also included are three new novellas ("Hollywood Fuck Pad", "Hot-Prowl Rape-O", and "Jungle Jihad") and one short story previously published in GQ ("The Trouble I Cause"). Earlier GQ pieces by Ellroy can be found in the 1999 collection Crime Wave.

Contents
Part I: Crime Culture / Memoir
"Balls to the Wall"
"Where I Get My Weird Shit"
"Stephanie"
"Grave Doubt"
"My Life as a Creep"
"The D.A."
"Little Sleazer and the Mail-Sex Mama"
"I've Got the Goods"
"The Trouble I Cause"
Part II: Rick Loves Donna
"Hollywood Fuck Pad"
"Hot-Prowl Rape-O"
"Jungle Jihad"

References

2004 short story collections
Crime short stories
Non-fiction crime books
Short story collections by James Ellroy
Books with cover art by Chip Kidd